The 296th Infantry Division was an infantry division of the German Heer during World War II.

History 

The 296th Infantry Division was formed on 5 February 1940 as a division of the eighth Aufstellungswelle in the Passau-Deggendorf area in Wehrkreis XIII. Its initial regiments were the Infantry Regiment 519, 520, 521, as well as Artillery Regiment 296 "Reichsgründung". The initial commander of the 296th Infantry Division was Wilhelm Stemmermann, appointed on 1 January 1941.

Between the summer of 1940 and the spring of 1941, the 296th Infantry Division was stationed in the Lille area.

Between June 1941 and July 1944, the 296th Infantry Division fought on the Eastern Front. Between June and September 1941, the division served under Army Group South, and was then transferred to Army Group Center, where it remained until its destruction in 1944. The division fought at the Battle of Kiev between August and September 1941 and then advanced via Tula towards Oryol, where it remained through the year 1942 and into August 1943. Until June 1944, it was driven back to Babruysk via Gomel.

The division was destroyed at Babruysk during Operation Bagration. The division was formally dissolved on 3 August 1944.

Superior formations

Noteworthy individuals 

 Wilhelm Stemmermann, divisional commander between 1 January 1941 and 8 January 1942.
 Friedrich Krischer, divisional commander between 8 January 1942 and 3 April 1943.
 Karl Faulenbach, divisional commander between 3 April 1943 and 1 January 1944.
 Arthur Kullmer, divisional commander between 1 January 1944 and 3 August 1944.

References 

Infantry divisions of Germany during World War II
Military units and formations established in 1940
Military units and formations disestablished in 1944